Relaxing was a bay thoroughbred born in 1976 at the Ogden Phipps stud farm in Kentucky. She was a stakes winner and an outstanding broodmare.

Racing
As a youngster, Relaxing was sent to England to race. At the age of three years, she had four wins and one second out of nine races on turf before she returned to America to race on the U.S.'s dirt tracks.  In 1980, at age four, she started twelve times, winning five races, and set a new track record for going 1 5/8 miles in 2:42.2 during her victory against colts in the Gallant Fox Handicap (Gr-2). Relaxing also equaled a track record in the Firenze Handicap (Gr-2). In 1981, as a five-year-old, she was named Eclipse Champion Older Mare. That year, she won the Ruffian Handicap (Gr-1) and Delaware Handicap (Gr-1). She also beat males  in the John B. Campbell Handicap (Gr-2) and the ungraded Assault Handicap besides finishing third to John Henry in the Jockey Club Gold by less than a length.

Broodmare career
As a broodmare, Relaxing produced twelve foals, nine of which started. The most famous one was champion Easy Goer, who is best known for his rivalry with Sunday Silence during the Triple Crown of 1989. Her daughters Easy Now and Cadillacing were both Grade 1 winners, and Cadillacing became a successful broodmare. Relaxing was voted Kentucky Broodmare of the Year in 1989.

Relaxing died in May 1999 at the age of 23  from foaling complications. She was buried in Claiborne Farm's horse cemetery.

References

1976 racehorse births
1999 racehorse deaths
Racehorses bred in Kentucky
Racehorses trained in the United States
Phipps family
American Champion racehorses
Kentucky Broodmare of the Year
Thoroughbred family 1-x